The Colt Delta Elite is a modified M1911 pistol, Series 80 configuration, chambered for the 10mm Auto. It is similar to the M1911 in design and operation. Colt manufactured both stainless steel and blued versions with eight-round magazines. A Delta Gold Cup model was also offered for target competition. The stainless steel Government Model version has recently been reintroduced.

Released in 1987, it was the second commercial pistol chambered in the 10mm cartridge, following the Dornaus & Dixon manufactured Bren Ten pistol, which was released in 1983 and pioneered the 10mm Auto chambering.

History
The Delta Elite is credited as being the first firearm produced by a major manufacturer to chamber the 10mm. The ill-fated Bren Ten sparked interest in the 10mm round with outdoorsmen and as a defense round.

The pistol was dropped from production in 1996 due to lackluster sales and the availability of smaller pistols with higher magazine capacities chambered in .40 S&W.

Colt announced the re-introduction of the Delta Elite at the 2008 SHOT Show. This new generation is generally similar to the previous version.  The "new" Delta Elites will be manufactured with the traditional barrel/bushing arrangement. Colt Customer Service stated they had a lack of acceptable accuracy problem with the "bull" bushingless barrel setup. That was the cause of the delay in the Delta Elite's production schedule. The new Delta Elite pistol was released March 31, 2009.

Design
The Delta Elite is a standard M1911 design, with a few minor differences from the latest Series 80 derivative of that pistol. It carries the rowel "Commander" type hammer of that pistol and the same overall features of the 1911 that have made it so popular with users. However, the Delta Elite carries a stiffer double recoil spring to handle the increased recoil of the 10mm round. Unlike the .400 Corbon, the 10mm can easily exceed the pressure levels of the .357 Magnum, thus stressing the original design's limitations, unless care is given. Many gunsmiths have their own modifications which they feel adjust the level of felt recoil of the Delta Elite. Some of the first Delta Elites had a tendency to suffer flex-induced slide rail stress cracks.  This was quickly addressed by removing the section of the rail above the slide-stop cutout.

Variants
Variant 1 Blued – a standard blued Delta Elite.
Variant 1 Stainless – a standard stainless Delta Elite, featuring pebbled texture wrap-around grips and a solid silver aluminum trigger.
Variant 2 – Colt Gold Cup Ten. Assembled by Colt Custom Shop with only 500 being produced. Serial Numbers begin GCTEN ending with numerals from 001 to 500.
Variant 3 – Colt Match 10. The Gold Cup versions were not available at the time, so this was the most advanced 'Gold Cup' type available. The adjustable Millet style sight allows it to be centered for decent groups at 25 yards. According to Colt, approximately 400 were manufactured in 1988.
Variant 4 – spur hammer with black grips
Special variant – Colt Elite Ten Forty — the Colt Elite Ten/Forty was a special edition for Lew Horton Co. in the early 1990s. This edition is a special dual caliber offering of the Combat Elite semi-automatic pistol. The pistol is furnished in .40 S&W and includes a 10mm Auto conversion kit consisting of a barrel slide stop, two recoil springs and guide, and a stainless steel 10mm magazine. In addition, each pistol is specially roll-marked "ELITE TEN/FORTY" on the left side of the slide and features a flat mainspring housing. This edition consists of approximately 411 units and utilizes a special serial number prefix 1040E.
New variation – reintroduced in 2009 (model O2020) with diamond texture wrap-around grips. Updated recoil spring and guide rod.  In 2015, a version with wood grips and serrated front strap was introduced (O2020WG). In 2016, a small run of two-tone blued slide/ stainless steel frame O2020s was manufactured for distribution by Bill Hicks (box marked O2020 but sometimes referred to as O2020Z). Also in 2016, the Delta Elite was upgraded to model O2020XE, with Novak sights, extended thumb safety, beavertail grip safety, enhanced hammer, flared ejector port, Gold Cup serrations, and 3 hole trigger. A FDE cerakote version of this gun was offered by Davidson's (O2020FDE).  In 2017, Colt introduced the Delta Elite Rail Gun (O2020RG).

See also
Glock 20, another relatively successful pistol chambered for 10mm Auto
Kimber Eclipse, another 1911-style handgun chambered in 10mm Auto
Tanfoglio Force, a popular Italian-made clone of the CZ-75 chambered in 10mm Auto

References

External links

Carryconcealed.net reviews the Colt Government 10mm
Ballistics By The Inch testing of ballistic performance of the Delta Elite.

10mm Auto semi-automatic pistols
Colt semi-automatic pistols
1911 platform
Police weapons
Weapons and ammunition introduced in 1987